The following is a list of county roads in Leon County, Florida.  All county roads are maintained by the county in which they reside. Some three-digit county roads have also been signed with the number zero as a fourth digit.

County roads in Leon County

References

FDOT Map of Leon County

 
County